Historia Naturalis Brasiliae, originally written in Latin, is the first scientific work on the natural history of Brazil, written by Dutch naturalist Willem Piso and containing research done by the German scientist Georg Marcgraf, published in 1648. The work includes observations made by the German naturalist H. Gralitzio, in addition to humanist Johannes de Laet. It was dedicated to Johan Maurits, Count of Nassau, who was the patron of the project during the period of Dutch rule in Brazil.

Though referring to Brazil generally throughout the text, the authors' research was of the coastal strip of the Northeast, occupied by the Dutch West India Company. It is based on Marcgraf and Piso's time in Brazil, starting in 1637. It  offers an important early European insight into Brazilian flora and fauna by analyzing plants and animals and studying tropical diseases and indigenous therapies.  Also included is William Piso's interpretation and first opinions of the indigenous people who he would go on to describe as barbarous and lacking in science.  This would lead to concern amongst Piso and his contemporaries that these people might not be able to contribute to studying medicine and botany.

It was edited, as stated on its title page, in: "Lugdun. Batavorum: apud Franciscum Hackium; et Amstelodami: apud Lud. Elzevirium". Elzevirium is the Latin name of the prestigious publisher Elzevir.

The work consists of a single volume, originally measuring 40 centimeters (height) and its full title, with subtitle, is: " Historia naturalis Brasiliae ...: in qua non tantum plantae et animalia, sed et indigenarum morbi, ingenia et mores describuntur et iconibus supra quingentas illustrantur  ".

The Brazilian physician and researcher Juliano Moreira said of the work:  This clearly masterful work, when carefully reexamined, shows, at each perquisition, new excellences, and thus it is still one of the most authentic glories of Dutch medical literature. We owe to Pies a description, so accurate and meticulous, of the then reigning endemics in Brazil and the means of treating them. He observed the yaws, tetanus, various types of paralysis, dysentery, hemeralopia, maculopapular. He described Ipecac and emeto - cathartic qualities, which aboriginals used long before the famous doctor Adrian Helvetius, grandfather of the notable French philosopher Claudio Adriano Helvetius received from Louis XIV a thousand louis gold, titles and honors for having discovered exactly those same therapeutic virtues. The Treaty of Helvetius titled "Remède contre le cours du ventre.

The work circulated widely in northern Europe and beyond, so that while it detailed the flora and fauna of coastal South America, it was an important publication for those working elsewhere. Richly illustrated scientific texts allowed knowledge to be disseminated even when scholars themselves could not travel to the research site.  The work remained unsurpassed until the nineteenth century, and between its initial publication and subsequent research it remained highly influential.  Diverse writers referred to the text, including Miguel Venegas, author of Noticia de la California (1757), Anglo-American Protestant theologian Cotton Mather, who saw in the text evidence of divine planning; and amateur American naturalist Thomas Jefferson, who mentioned Marcgraf in his Notes on the State of Virginia.

This work would prove to be incredibly influential especially in the field of ecology, being used by a variety of different ecologists in different locations and time. The long lasting influence could be seen outside of just the field of ecology, as well, with various other forms of science utilizing the findings in various ways. In particular, Ole Worm utilized a similar organizational structure when documenting natural history of Denmark while even using some of the images in his work, Museum Wormianum. Carl Linnaeus and Albert Aublet would also use the work of Macgrave in several of their texts and images.

Relevancy was still found in the 20th century with a herbarium being discovered that would contain a hefty amount of items that were used in the Netherlands during the 17th century. The utility of these documents from John Maurice, Prince of Nassau-Siegen were able to assist other researchers and academics even in a more modern context. This discovery would also cause people to seek out a variety of these books detailing herbariums in order to achieves further information that Maurice may have.

See also
Dutch Brazil
History of science
Natural history

References 

1648 books
Dutch Brazil
Natural history
Natural history books
Flora of Brazil
Brazilian literature
17th-century Latin books
17th-century Dutch books
Biology and natural history in the Dutch Republic
History of science